There have been two baronetcies created for members of the Salusbury family, the first in the Baronetage of England and the second in the Baronetage of Great Britain. Neither title has survived to the present day although the senior baronetcy is technically considered to be dormant.

The Salusbury Baronetcy, of Lleweni in the County of Denbighshire in the Baronetage of England was created on 10 November 1619 for Sir Henry Salusbury, the grandson of Catherine of Berain and a cousin of Elizabeth I. Salusbury was succeeded by his only son, Thomas, the second baronet. He was Member of Parliament for Denbighshire in the Short Parliament and served on Charles I’s council of war at the Battle of Edgehill. On his death in 1643, his title passed to his eldest son, Thomas, the third baronet. He died unexpectedly at Lleweni Hall and was succeeded by his younger brother, John, the fourth baronet. He was both Member of Parliament for Denbigh Boroughs and Deputy Lieutenant of Denbighshire from 1661 until his death in 1684. Sir John Salusbury had no male issue, at which point the title became dormant.

The Salusbury Baronetcy, of Llanwern in the County of Monmouthshire in the Baronetage of Great Britain was created on 4 May 1795 for Sir Robert Salusbury of Llanwern, a distant cousin of the Llewenis. He first served as Member of Parliament for Monmouthshire from 1792 to 1796 and was succeeded in that seat by his nephew Sir Charles Morgan. He was returned that same year as Member of Parliament for Brecon from 1796 to 1812. A victim of a conspiracy, he died penniless in 1815 and was succeeded by his eldest son, Thomas Robert, the second baronet. On his death in 1835 he was succeeded by his younger brother, Charles John, the third baronet. Charles died in 1868 with no male issue, thereby rendering the baronetcy extinct.

The family also has the distinction of having had William Shakespeare dedicate a major poem, The Phoenix and the Turtle, to the loving relationship that John Salusbury, the father of the first baronet, had with his wife Ursula. Their seat was located at Lleweni Hall in Tremeirchion.

The last family member with a direct blood connection to the Lleweni baronetcy was Hester Piozzi, who attempted to secure a collateral succession to the title from the College of Arms on behalf of her adopted son, John Salusbury Piozzi-Salusbury. In January 1813 she petitioned the College to grant her son the heraldic rights to the Lleweni legacy and Garter complied with her memorial by issuing letters patent dated 6 December 1813. On 24 April 1817 he was made a Knight Bachelor and Piozzi now sought to convert her son's title into a baronetcy. In 1820 she gave Salusbury £6,000 for this express purpose, but he appears to have spent the money elsewhere and took no further action to obtain the baronetcy.

Salusbury Baronets, of Lleweni (1619)

 Sir Henry Salusbury, 1st Baronet  (1589–1632)
 Sir Thomas Salusbury, 2nd Baronet (1612–1643)
 Sir Thomas Salusbury, 3rd Baronet (1634–1658)
 Sir John Salusbury, 4th Baronet  (died 1684)

The baronetcy is legally considered dormant, although it is effectively extinct.

Salusbury Baronets, of Llanwern (1795)
 Sir Robert Salusbury, 1st Baronet (1756–1817)
 Sir Thomas Robert Salusbury, 2nd Baronet  (1783–1835)
 Sir Charles John Salusbury, 3rd Baronet  (1792–1868) Extinct on his death

See also
Salusbury family
Welsh baronets

References

Extinct baronetcies in the Baronetage of England
Extinct baronetcies in the Baronetage of Great Britain
Salusbury family
Tremeirchion
1619 establishments in England